Cochylis sagittigera is a species of moth of the family Tortricidae. It is found in Mato Grosso, Brazil. They are nocturnal.

References

Moths described in 1983
Cochylis